Fotemustine is a nitrosourea alkylating agent used in the treatment of metastatic melanoma.  It is available in Europe but has not been approved by the United States FDA. A study has shown that fotemustine produces improved response rates and but does not increase survival (over dacarbazine in the treatment of disseminated cutaneous melanoma. Median survival was 7.3 months with fotemustine versus 5.6 months with DTIC (P=.067). There was also toxicity prevalence in fotemustine arm. The main toxicity was grade 3 to 4 neutropenia (51% with fotemustine v 5% with DTIC) and thrombocytopenia (43% v 6%, respectively).

External links

Alkylating antineoplastic agents
Nitrosamines
Nitrosoureas
Organochlorides
Phosphonate esters
Ureas
Chloroethyl compounds